KF Xixa is a football club based in the village of Greshenicë, Kërçovë, North Macedonia. They are currently competing in the OFS Kičevo league.

History
The club was founded in 2015.

References

External links
KF Xixa Facebook 
Club info at MacedonianFootball 
Football Federation of Macedonia 

Xixa
Association football clubs established in 2015
2015 establishments in the Republic of Macedonia
FK
Xixa